Anaxita is a genus of moths in the family Erebidae. The genus was erected by Francis Walker in 1855.

Species
Anaxita brueckneri
Anaxita decorata
Anaxita drucei
Anaxita martha
Anaxita sannionis
Anaxita sophia
Anaxita suprema
Anaxita tricoloriceps
Anaxita vetusta

References

Phaegopterina
Moth genera